Glennie is a surname. Notable people with the surname include:

Alick Glennie (1925—2003), British computer scientist
Alison Glennie, British actress
Angus Glennie, Lord Glennie (born 1950), Scottish judge
Bill Glennie (1924—2005), Canadian ice hockey player
Bobby Glennie (born 1957), Scottish footballer
Brian Glennie (born 1946), Canadian ice hockey player
Charlotte Glennie (born c.1972), New Zealand journalist
Ernest Glennie (c.1871—1908), New Zealand rugby union player
Evelyn Glennie (born 1965), Scottish musician
George Glennie (born 1902), American football player
Irvine Glennie (1892—1980), Royal Navy officer
Jim Glennie (born 1963), British musician
John Stuart Stuart-Glennie (1841—1910), British folklorist
Scott Glennie (born 1991), Canadian ice hockey player
William Glennie (1761—1828), British teacher

See also
Glennie, Michigan, unincorporated community in Curtis Township, Michigan
Glennie was the nickname of the first platypus to have her genome sequenced

References